Arthur Jennings may refer to:

 Arthur Bates Jennings (1850–1927), American architect
 Arthur Jennings (rugby union) (born 1940), Fijian-born New Zealand rugby union player